Rycroft may refer to:

People
Al Rycroft (born 1950), Canadian ice hockey player
Andrew Rycroft (born 1955), British microbiologist
Carter Rycroft (born 1977), Canadian curler
Charles Rycroft (businessman) (1901–1998), British businessman and philanthropist
Charles Rycroft (1914–1998), British psychologist and writer
Leanne Rycroft (born 1969), Australian gymnast
Mark Rycroft (born 1978), Canadian ice hockey player
Martin Rycroft (born 1983), Welsh pop singer
Matthew Rycroft (born 1968), British diplomat
Melissa Rycroft (born 1983), American reality television star
Michael Rycroft (born 1938), British ionospheric physicist
Philip Rycroft (born 1961), British civil servant
Richard Rycroft (born 1960), English actor and comedian
William Rycroft (1861–1925), British army general and colonial governor
Rycroft baronets in the Baronetcy of Great Britain

Places
Rycroft, Alberta, a village in northern Alberta, Canada

See also
Ryecroft (disambiguation)
 Roycroft